This is an article about a baseball player. For softball coach, see Carl C. Taylor.

Carl Means Taylor (born January 20, 1944) is a retired American professional baseball player. He appeared in 411 Major League games as a catcher, outfielder, first baseman and pinch hitter from 1968 to 1973 for the Pittsburgh Pirates, St. Louis Cardinals and Kansas City Royals.

Taylor batted under .250 for four of his six Major League seasons. The Bucs then shipped him to the Cardinals in an offseason trade — although they would reacquire Taylor in September 1971 for their pennant drive. He was not eligible to play in the 1971 World Series, won by Pittsburgh in seven games over Powell's Orioles.

Overall, Taylor batted .266 in 846 Major League at bats; his 225 hits included 31 doubles and ten triples.

References

External links

1944 births
Living people
Baseball players from Florida
Sportspeople from Sarasota, Florida
Major League Baseball catchers
Major League Baseball outfielders
Pittsburgh Pirates players
St. Louis Cardinals players
Kansas City Royals players
Asheville Tourists players
Macon Pirates players
Kingsport Pirates players
Columbus Jets players
Batavia Pirates players
Kinston Eagles players
Omaha Royals players
Key West High School alumni